Muhambwe is an administrative division in Kibondo District of Kigoma Region in Tanzania. In 2016 the Tanzania National Bureau of Statistics report there were 287,652 people in the division.

References

Kibondo District
Wards of Kigoma Region
Constituencies of Tanzania